State Route 425 (SR 425) is a  state highway that serves the town of Verdi in Washoe County, Nevada. Interstate 80 Business is routed along the highway and extends beyond the terminus of the state route. SR 425 was formerly a part of SR 1 and U.S. Route 40 (US 40).

Route description

SR 425 begins at the intersection of Third Street, Gold Ranch Road, and a state maintained frontage road in Verdi, near the West Verdi interchange (Exit 2) with Interstate 80. The highway follows Third Street northeast through the center of Verdi, then southeast to its terminus at the I-80 East Verdi interchange (Exit 5).

Although designated a state route and an Interstate business route, there are no route shields posted along the highway itself.

The I-80 business route extends beyond the end of SR 425.

History

The highway originally carried State Route 1 and later U.S. Route 40 on its trek west from Reno over Donner Pass towards Sacramento, California. As Interstate 80 was being completed in the 1960s, it was largely replacing US 40 throughout the western United States. US 40 was truncated to a western terminus in Reno by 1966, officially removing the route from Verdi; however, some 1970s era maps still showed US 40 in Verdi.

With the Nevada state highway renumbering that occurred in the mid 1970s, State Route 425 was assigned to Old US 40 through Verdi.

Major intersections

See also

References

425
Interstate 80
U.S. Route 40
Transportation in Washoe County, Nevada